Christopher R. Mwashinga, Jr (born 9 January 1965) is a Tanzanian author and poet from Mbeya, Tanzania who lives in the United States. He has published books of Christian poetry, theology, mission, and religious history. His poetry has been published in reputable anthologies in the United States, and other countries including Kenya, Singapore, and Tanzania. He writes in English and Kiswahili.

Early life 
Christopher Richard Mwashinga was born to Richard Male Mwashinga and Christine Mwashinga in the Igawilo ward of Mbeya, Tanzania. He is the third of the eleven children born to his parents.

Education 
For his primary school, Mwashinga attended Ngare-Nairobi Primary School in West Kilimanjaro before he moved south to attend Igawilo Secondary School in Mbeya (O-Levels), and Songea Boys High School in Songea (A-Levels)–all in Tanzania. He was trained in theology at the Tanzania Adventist College (now the University of Arusha) in Tanzania and the University of Eastern Africa, Baraton in Kenya where he earned a B.A in theology degree. He then moved for graduate studies to the Seventh-day Adventist Theological Seminary on the campus of Andrews University, located at Berrien Springs, Michigan, US. At the seminary, Mwashinga earned two master's degrees: a Master of Divinity and a Master of Arts in Religion (Systematic Theology). He is currently completing a PhD in Systematic Theology in the same institution.

Personal life
Mwashinga is married to Ruth Michael Mwashinga and together they have three children: Christopher Richard Mwashinga II, Anna Nakijwa Mwashinga, and Richard Aaron Mwashinga. Mwashinga enjoys traveling to new cultures as he preaches and writes his Christian poetry and non-fiction.

Youth and student ministry
For many years, Mwashinga, an ordained minister of the Seventh-day Adventist Church, served the youth and public university students in East Africa. Before going to the US for further studies he worked as a chaplain in charge of Public Campus Ministries in the South-West Tanzania Field (now Southern Highlands Conference) headquartered in Mbeya. He also served as director of several church departments in the Eastern Tanzania Conference of Seventh-day Adventists, including: Public Campus Ministries, Youth, Education, Children's Ministries, Public Affairs and Religious Liberty, and as coordinator of the Satellite Evangelism Program for the same conference. During his tenure, Mwashinga started a program he called Campus Evangelistic Campaigns (CEC) which was responsible for organizing and running evangelistic campaigns in major public universities in Tanzania. Between 2000–2004 he personally conducted big evangelistic campaigns in Sokoine University of Agriculture, University of Dar es Salaam, and Mzumbe University, utilizing major university auditoriums such as Nkrumah Hall (University of Dar es Salaam), New Assembly Hall (Mzumbe University) and Multi-purpose Hall (Sokoine University of Agriculture), among others. He also spoke to university communities in a number of Kenyan universities including the University of Nairobi, Moi University, and the University of Eastern Africa, Baraton. His was a familiar voice in many of these centers of learning. He also spoke internationally as he visited universities around the world. For the past twenty years, Mwashinga has travelled widely representing the Seventh-day Adventist Church in international conferences or preaching assignments. Between 2000 and 2017 alone, he crossed the Atlantic 15 times. His ministry and study tours took him to Brazil, Canada, the United States, the Netherlands, the United Kingdom, Germany, Rwanda, Uganda, Thailand, Kenya, Greece, Turkey, Egypt, Tanzania, Israel, the Czech Republic, and Zambia among others. During those international trips, he presented on a variety of subjects and wrote hundreds of letters and emails. He also wrote hundreds of poems both English and Kiswahili, and always kept a diary.

Non-fiction and Christian poetry
Mwashinga began to write and recite poetry at a fairly young age. He was about 13 when his first piece was published in Kilimanjaro Leo a weekly Kiswahili Newspaper in his native country of Tanzania. Since then he has published three collections of English poems: Beeches of Golden Sand: Inspirational Poems (2009) Windows of Love (2012), and Ocean of Grace (2016). He has also published three collections of Kiswahili poetry entitled Sauti Toka Ughaibuni (Voice From the Diaspora), Kilele Cha Tumaini (Summit of Hope), and Tumaini Lenye Baraka: Diwani ya Christopher Mwashinga (The Blessed Hope). Furthermore, he has published more than fifteen other books both scholarly and popular, mostly in the area of theology, mission and history of Christianity. The most notableworks in the area of non-fiction are perhaps his books on Mission Theology and a History of Christian Missions in East Africa, Uadventista Barani Afrika: Changamoto na Fursa za Ukuaji (Adventism in Africa: Challenges and Opportunities for Growth), and The Works of Christopher Mwashinga in multiple volumes.

Membership in professional organizations 
 Adventist Theological Society
 American Academy of Religion
 Michigan Academy of Science, Arts, and Letters
 American Academy of Poets
 Evangelical Theological Society

Publications
Non-fiction
 2011: Rays of Hope: Living to Make a Difference 
 2012: Enduring the Cross: Messages of Salvation and Hope 
 2013: Utume na Ukristo Katika Afrika Mashariki
 2013: Mission Theology and a History of Christian Missions in East Africa 
 2013: Barua na Mashairi 
 2014: Insights From Bible Lands: Turkey, Israel, Egypt, and Greece 
 2014: Waadventista wa Sabato na Utunzaji wa Sabato: Historia Fupi 
 2016: Moments of my Christian Experience 
 2017: Uadventista Barani Afrika: Changamoto na Fursa za Ukuaji 
 2018: Kumtumaini Yesu 
 2019: Crisscrossing the United States. 
 2020: Waraka wa Paulo kwa Waefeso. 
 2020: A History of Christianity in East Africa: The Beginning and Development of Missions 
 2022: Christ on Campus: Meeting Jesus on University Campus 

Poetry 
 2009: Beaches of Golden Sand: Inspirational Poems 
 2012: Windows of Love 
 2014: Sauti Toka Ughaibuni 
 2016: Kilele cha Tumaini 
 2016: Ocean of Grace 
 2017: Tumaini Lenye Baraka: Diwani ya Christopher Mwashinga 
 2018: Sauti ya Faraja na Matumaini 
 2019: Mdomo Mmoja, Masikio Mawili: Mashairi ya Watoto 
 2019: Short Poems of Christopher Mwashinga 
 2020: Mionzi ya Matumaini 
 2021: Njia ya Matumaini 
 2022: Mwenge wa Matumaini 
 2021: Collected Poems of Christopher Mwashinga: 1991–2021 
The Works of Christopher Mwashinga project 1 (English)
 2014: The Works of Christopher Mwashinga Vol. I, Letters 
 2014: The Works of Christopher Mwashinga Vol. II, Sermons, Addresses, and Poems 
 2020: The Works of Christopher Mwashinga Vol. III, Theology and Mission 
 2017: The Works of Christopher Mwashinga Vol. IV, Journals and Diaries (1), 
The Works of Christopher Mwashinga project 2 (Swahili)
 2019: Kazi za Christopher Mwashinga, Juzuu ya I: Maandiko ya Awali 
 2020: Kazi za Christopher Mwashinga, Juzuu II: Mashairi 
 2020: Kazi za Christopher Mwashinga, Juzuu III: Utume, Theolojia, Mahubiri, Barua 
Journal Articles

See also 

 Seventh-day Adventist Church
 Ellen G. White
 Adventist
 Adventist Health Studies
 Sabbath in Christianity
 History of the Seventh-day Adventist Church
 28 fundamental beliefs
 Questions on Doctrine
 Biblical Research Institute
 Teachings of Ellen White#End times
 Inspiration of Ellen White
 Prophecy in the Seventh-day Adventist Church
 Investigative judgment
 The Pillars of Adventism
 Conditional Immortality
 Historicism
 Three Angels' Messages
 Inspiration of Ellen White
 Ellen G. White

References

1965 births
Living people
Tanzanian writers
People from Mbeya Region
Tanzanian non-fiction writers
Tanzanian poets
Swahili-language writers
Andrews University alumni
Tanzanian Seventh-day Adventists
Seventh-day Adventist ministers